....And Proud (stylized as ....and Proud) is a series of documentaries created for Virgin 1 designed to examine people who lead lifestyles tied to taboo subjects, narrated by Sue Perkins.

Episodes

References

2008 British television series debuts
2008 British television series endings
Channel One (British and Irish TV channel) original programming
English-language television shows